Julio Idrovo (born 15 March 1981) is an Ecuadorian weightlifter. He competed in the men's lightweight event at the 2004 Summer Olympics.

References

1981 births
Living people
Ecuadorian male weightlifters
Olympic weightlifters of Ecuador
Weightlifters at the 2004 Summer Olympics
People from Cuenca, Ecuador
21st-century Ecuadorian people